Ivan Sondey (born 15 January 1994) is a professional Ukrainian football midfielder who plays for Prykarpattia Ivano-Frankivsk.

Career
Sondey is a product of the different youth sportive school systems.

He played in the team of a regional level FC Kalush, but in July 2012 signed his contract with the professional FC Dnipro and then with the FC Naftovyk-Ukrnafta Okhtyrka in the Ukrainian First League.

References

External links

1994 births
Living people
Ukrainian footballers
FC Kalush players
FC Naftovyk-Ukrnafta Okhtyrka players
Association football midfielders
FC Olimpik Donetsk players
MFC Mykolaiv players
FC Prykarpattia Ivano-Frankivsk (1998) players
Ukrainian Premier League players
Sportspeople from Ivano-Frankivsk Oblast